Pauli is a lunar impact crater that is located on the Moon's far side. It lies about halfway  between the lunar equator and southern pole, across the southern rim of the larger walled plain Roche.

This crater has a well-defined outer rim that is only mildly worn by impact erosion. A small crater lies on the inner side along the south, and another on the opposite face of the crater to the north. There is some slight terracing along the southeast inner wall, but the remainder displays more of a radially grooved appearance. The inner wall is narrower along the northern side where it overlies Roche.

The interior floor has been flooded with lava, leaving a low-albedo surface that is darker than the surrounding terrain. In this respect it is similar to the crater Jules Verne located about four crater diameters to the northeast. There is a low ridge structure near the midpoint, and the remains of a ghost crater in the southeastern part of the floor.

Satellite craters
By convention these features are identified on lunar maps by placing the letter on the side of the crater midpoint that is closest to Pauli.

References

 
 
 
 
 
 
 
 
 
 
 
 

impact craters on the Moon